Lazos de amor (English title: Τies of love) is a Mexican telenovela produced by Carla Estrada for Televisa in 1995. It stars Lucero and Luis José Santander.

Plot
The series centers around María Guadalupe, María Paula and María Fernanda, identical triplets (all played by Lucero) with non-identical, complex personalities. When they all were very young, they were victims of a car accident that killed their parents.

As a result of the accident, María Guadalupe is presumed dead when she disappears after falling into a river. Instead, she suffers from amnesia and forgets she has a family and two sisters. Ana Salas, who is going through a tragedy coping with her own mother's death, raises María Guadalupe as her own, even after becoming aware of her true identity.

María Fernanda is a sweet girl who hopes to find her sister, but as a result of the accident is left blind. María Paula is different from her sisters in that she's glamorous, selfish and extremely jealous; however, she also harbors a devastating secret about the accident.

After an illness brings María Guadalupe and Ana to México City, María Guadalupe falls in love with Nicolás, a cab driver and good-hearted man, who had just moved to México to live with his grandmother. Living in fear that someone may recognize her daughter, Ana restricts María Guadalupe's actions, but Nicolás's grandmother learns Ana's secret without saying a word.

The girls' grandmother, Mercedes, and their uncle, Eduardo, have been searching for missing María Guadalupe for years, and the story inches closer and closer to the revelation of the truth as the ties of love eventually draw the three sisters together, weaving through the lives of those that surround them in unexpected ways.

Cast

Main 
 Lucero as María Guadalupe Rivas Iturbe/Salas/Miranda / María Paula Rivas Iturbe / María Fernanda Rivas Iturbe/Sandoval / Laura Rivas (Triplets' mother) 
 Luis José Santander as Nicolás Miranda

Recurring 

 Marga López as Doña Mercedes de Iturbe
 Luis Bayardo as Edmundo Sandoval
 Demián Bichir as Valente Segura
 Maty Huitrón as Ana Salas
 Felicia Mercado as Nancy Balboa
 Guillermo Murray as Alejandro Molina
 Ana Luisa Peluffo as Aurora Campos
 Otto Sirgo as Eduardo Rivas
 Juan Manuel Bernal as Gerardo Sandoval
 Bárbara Córcega as Flor
 Crystal as Soledad Jiménez
 Nerina Ferrer as Irene
 Mariana Karr as Susana Ferreira
 Verónica Merchant as Virginia Altamirano
 Alejandra Peniche as Julieta
 Angélica Vale as Tere
 Guillermo Zarur as Professor Mariano López
 Orlando Miguel as Osvaldo Larrea
 Eric del Castillo as Sacerdote
 Erik Rubín as Carlos León
 Guillermo Aguilar as Pablo Altamirano
 Emma Teresa Armendáriz as Felisa
 Enrique Becker as Sergio
 Rosenda Bernal as Sonia
 Víctor Carpinteiro as Javier
 Juan Carlos Colombo as Samuel Levy
 Luis de Icaza as Gordo
 Monica Miguel as Chole
 Fabián Robles as Genovevo "Geno" Ramos
 Mónika Sánchez as Diana
 Karla Talavera as Rosy
 Paty Thomas as Cecilia
 Gaston Tuset as Néstor Miranda
 Silvia Derbez as Doña Milagros
 Ernesto Laguardia as Bernardo Rivas

Guest stars 
 Raúl Velasco as Himself
 Eugenio Cobo as Himself
 Luis García as Himself
 Silvia Pinal as Herself
 Silvia Pasquel as Herself
 María Sorté as Herself
 Eugenio Derbez as Himself
 Leticia Calderón as Assistant of Silvia Pinal

Controversial ending
In the final episode, Maria Paula locks her two sisters in the basement of her mansion and holds them hostage.  As their uncle Eduardo tries to rescue them, Maria Paula shoots and kills him. In an off-screen melee, as Gerardo and Nicolas come to check on them well-being, another gunshot is heard by the viewing audience and both Maria Guadalupe and Maria Fernanda emerge from the room relatively unscathed, while Maria Paula is rolled out in a body bag along with Eduardo. Maria Guadalupe and Nicolas then have a typical fairy tale novela wedding.  In the final scene, Maria Guadalupe and Nicolas are in a hotel room on their honeymoon, but when the camera zooms into Maria Guadalupe's face, she rubs her eyebrow with her pinky finger, which was Maria Paula's trademark idiosyncratic habit.  This left viewers to speculate whether it was actually Maria Guadalupe instead of Maria Paula who died by gunshot wound and Maria Paula had assumed her identity.

The show's ending since then had left fans to debate over the fate of the two. Questions came up such as the timing of Maria Paula being able to change clothes, jewelry, makeup, and hair appearance with Maria Guadalupe before supposedly shooting her until help arrived, as well as how Maria Guadalupe was able to get loose and grab the gun to shoot Maria Paula.

In 2019, Lucero gave her opinion on who it was that survived the final episode, believing that it was Maria Guadalupe who survived and had slain Maria Paula.

Awards

Album

Due to the telenovela's success, Televisa published a soundtrack, which included previously released songs by Lucero as well as three versions of the theme song of the series.

References

External links
 

1995 telenovelas
Mexican telenovelas
1995 Mexican television series debuts
1996 Mexican television series endings
Spanish-language telenovelas
Television shows set in Mexico
Televisa telenovelas
Lucero (entertainer) soundtracks